Dillistone is a surname. Notable people with the surname include:
 Frederick Dillistone (1903–1993), Dean of Liverpool
 Marcus Dillistone (born 1961), British film director